Mohammad Samim is a Nepalese politician. He is a member of Provincial Assembly of Madhesh Province from Nepali Congress. Samim, a resident of Rupani Rural Municipality, was elected via 2017 Nepalese provincial elections from Saptari 3(A).

Electoral history

2017 Nepalese provincial elections

References

Living people
1979 births
Nepalese Muslims
Madhesi people
21st-century Nepalese politicians
Members of the Provincial Assembly of Madhesh Province
Nepali Congress politicians from Madhesh Province